The Cadillac Lyriq is a battery electric crossover manufactured and marketed by the Cadillac subdivision of General Motors. As Cadillac's first fully electric vehicle, and the first GM production vehicle using the BEV3 platform, the Lyriq introduces a new version of GM's Super Cruise semi-autonomous driving system.

Assembled at Spring Hill Manufacturing in Spring Hill, Tennessee for North America and at a new EV-only plant in Yantai, China for Asia, Cadillac started accepting customer orders for the 2023 Lyriq in the United States in May 2022.

History 

At the 2019 North American International Auto Show, CEO Mary Barra presented several details about the group's upcoming series of EVs, which included a crossover from Cadillac. The name Lyriq follows a pattern of several prior Cadillac concept vehicles, including the Evoq, Provoq, and Celestiq, all ending in "q".

Cadillac originally planned for a US-market presentation of the Lyriq (as a "show car" or concept car) on April 2, 2020, followed by a launch soon thereafter for the 2021 model year. Due to the COVID-19 pandemic, it was postponed to August 6. Production of the Lyriq was also delayed to early 2022. Chinese and Asian market production at a new plant at Shanghai GM's Yantai complex built for Ultium will start slightly before Spring Hill starts Lyriq assembly for North America.

Following the public debut of the Lyriq show car at the 2021 Shanghai Auto Show, the production version was presented on April 21, 2021.

Batteries for both Yantai and Spring Hill production will be sourced from LG Chem, with Spring Hill initially getting pouch-type Ultium cells from an LG Chem plant in South Korea. This will be done until GM and LG Chem expand Spring Hill to accommodate Ultium battery production for both domestic use and exports to Mexico. According to Cadillac, all the interior components were newly designed for the Lyriq and no pre-existing GM parts were used.

The Lyriq was first delivered to American dealerships in the highest demand markets of New York, Los Angeles, and Detroit in the first week of July 2022.

Specifications

Powertrain
At debut, the Cadillac Lyriq is offered with a single motor driving the rear wheels. All-wheel drive is expected to follow in 2023.

It draws from a  battery with an estimated  range. The battery supports Level 2 and DC fast charging. The maximum charging rate is 190 kW using a DC fast charger, or 19.2 kW using AC.

References

External links
Official site

Lyriq
Electric vehicles
Production electric cars
Crossover sport utility vehicles
Cars introduced in 2021